Levent Uğur Yüksel (born October 21, 1964) is a Turkish pop singer and multi instrumentalist. He has been active in live music industry since 1993.

Life
Yüksel's interest in arts and music started in an early age. He started to play violin at the age of five. During his elementary and primary education, he sang in school events. Then he started singing in family and friends' wedding ceremonies. After graduation, he moved from the coastal city Antalya to the city of art, Istanbul, to study music in the Istanbul University State Conservatory (İstanbul Devlet Konservatuarı), and learned to play bass guitar and perform vocals.

Music career
During the beginning of 1990s, Yüksel was known to be one of the best bass guitar players in Turkey. In the year 1993, he released his first album as a pop singer, Med Cezir. The album made a dramatic change in Turkey's pop music taste, as it provided a new voice that has great capability mixed with new style of music. Although he released only 8 music albums as of 2015, his music is spread all over the world and copied in different languages. Young singers and bands starting their music career use his songs in their performances. The melody of Yüksel's 1996 hit "Zalim" was copied in several ad campaigns worldwide.

Discography

Albums
1993: Med Cezir "Tide"
1995: Levent Yüksel'in 2. CD'si "Levent Yüksel's 2nd CD"
1998: Adı Menekşe "Her name is Violet"
2000: Aşkla "with Love"
2004: Uslanmadım "I did not settle down"
2006: Kadın Şarkıları "Songs by Women"
2009: Sıfır Km "Brand-new"
2012: Topyekûn "Altogether"

Music videos
1996: Zalim "Cruel"
1998: Bi Daha "Again"

Singles
1997: Bi Daha "Again"
2010: Aşk Mümkün Müdür Hala "Is Love Still Possible?"

References

External links

Levent Yüksel on Spotify

Levent Yüksel's page on JollyJoker, Ankara best music stage

Living people
1964 births
Turkish male singers
People from Antalya
Turkish pop singers